Hawkesbury Quarry is a  geological Site of Special Scientific Interest near the village of Hawkesbury Upton, South Gloucestershire, notified in 1967.

The site is notable for containing both the oolitic limestone of the northern Cotswolds, and the fossil-bearing limestone found further south.

References

 English Nature citation sheet for the site  (accessed 11 July 2006)

Sites of Special Scientific Interest in Avon
Sites of Special Scientific Interest notified in 1967
Quarries in Gloucestershire